The Licciardi clan is a powerful Neapolitan Camorra clan that operates in the remote areas of Naples, specifically in the Secondigliano district and its stronghold of Masseria Cardone. Its sphere of influence extends to Scampia, Chiaiano, Miano and San Pietro a Patierno.

Leadership 

 1980s-1994  — Gennaro Licciardi, known as a scigna. (Died in prison in 1994)
 1994-2008 — Vincenzo Licciardi. (Arrested in 2008)
 1994-present — Maria Licciardi, known as La Madrina.

History
In the mid-eighties, Gennaro Licciardi, known as "a scigna-la scimmia", "the monkey" was the capozona in the district of Secondigliano for the Giuliano clan of Forcella. At that time, Licciardi was the second-in-command to boss Luigi Giuliano. The outskirts of the Secondigliano district was considered to be unimportant by the other Camorra bosses. A few years later, Gennaro Licciardi formed a fully independent clan that managed to turn the area into a strategic hub for the storage and trafficking of drugs. He also became the founding member of the Secondigliano Alliance, a coalition of powerful Camorra clans which controls drug trafficking and extortion rackets in many suburbs of Naples. Apart from the Licciardi clan, the alliance included the Contini, Mallardo, Lo Russo, Stabile, Prestieri, Bocchetti and Di Lauro clans.

After the death of Gennaro by blood poisoning in the Voghera prison on August 3, 1994, the management of the clan fell entirely to the brothers, Pietro "the Roman Emperor" and Vincenzo and also to his sister Maria, known as "la Piccolina", "the little one".

The clan used its influence to mediate between the Di Lauro clan and the so-called "secessionists" (Italian "scissionisti"), a breakaway fraction from the Di Lauro clan in the northern suburbs of Naples that tried to assert its control over drugs and prostitution rackets in the area. It therefore played an important role in putting an end to the Scampia feud.

On May 9, 2008, the Carabinieri seized goods worth 300 million euros and arrested 44 members of the Licciardi clan.

In February 2019, Giuseppe Musella, son of Maria Licciardi, was arrested. According to investigations, he was the current leader of the clan. Musella was arrested in Scampia for criminal association, robbery and kidnapping.

Activities

On March 21, 2018, 19 arrests were made in Rome of alleged members belonging to the Licciardi clan and members of the Filippone 'ndrina and Gallico 'ndrina accused of drug trafficking.

According to Francesco Forgione, the former president of the Antimafia Commission, the Licciardi clan is active in the Netherlands, using the country to counterfeit clothes.

See also

 Camorra
 List of members of the Camorra
 Contini clan
 List of Camorra clans
 'Ndrangheta
 Mallardo clan
 Secondigliano Alliance

References

 
1980s establishments in Italy
Transnational organized crime
Organised crime groups in the Netherlands
Organized crime groups in Romania